2009–10 Raiffeisen Superliga was the eleventh season of top-tier football in Kosovo. The campaign began on 15 August 2009, and ended on 30 May 2010.

Stadiums and locations

League table

Results

Matches 1–22

Matches 23–33

Relegation

References

External links
 2009-10 Superleague of Kosovo season at RSSSF

Football Superleague of Kosovo seasons
Kosovo
1